Tayammum is the Islamic act of dry ritual purification using purified (clean) sand or stone or mud, which may be performed in place of ritual washing (wudu or ghusl) if no clean water is readily available or if one is suffering from moisture-induced skin inflammation or scaling.

Etymology
Tayammum is an Arabic word that means an aim or purpose. Tayammum is derived from "amma," meaning 'to repair.'

In Islamic Law, Tayammum meaning to wipe the face and hands of a person with the purpose of purification and providing oneself to pray and by Aiming for or exploring soil, purified sand, or dust.

In the Quran 
"Oh you who believe! When you intend to offer As-Salat (the prayer), wash your faces and your hands (forearms) up to the elbows, rub (by passing wet hands over) your heads, and (wash) your feet up to ankles. If you are in a state of Janaba (i.e. after a sexual discharge), purify yourselves (bathe your whole body). But if you are ill or on a journey, or any of you comes after answering the call of nature, or you have been in contact with women (i.e. sexual intercourse), and you find no water, then perform tayammum with clean earth and rub therewith your faces and hands. Allah does not want to place you in difficulty, but He wants to purify you, and to complete His Favor to you that you may be thankful."

Circumstances

In the following eight circumstances, one has to make Tayammum rather than Wudu (ablution) or ghusl (a ritual bath): 

 when access to water is restricted or impractical
 When sufficient amounts of water for ritual washing are not available. 
 when using the available water for wudu or ghusl will leave insufficient water for drinking and will put you and your dependents at risk of dying of thirst or illness.
 When obtaining water is hazardous or prohibitively expensive.
 When using water poses a health risk.
 When the water available is impure. 
 when performing Wudu or Ghusl will make all or part of the time of prayer.

In the Quran
O you who have believed, do not approach prayer while you are intoxicated until you know what you are saying or in a state of janabah, except those passing through [a place of prayer], until you have washed [your whole body]. And if you are ill or on a journey or one of you comes from the place of relieving himself or you have contacted women and find no water, then seek clean earth and wipe over your faces and your hands [with it]. Indeed, Allah is ever Pardoning and Forgiving."

Thus, in case of illness, even if there is water, one still does not need to wash.

Performing Tayammum
Tayammum (التيمم) is practiced as follows:
Finding a piece of ground which is free of najaasah (unclean elements). This may be any kind of ground surface that naturally collects dust like rock or sand
 Intending tayammum
 Reciting the bismillah
 Placing ones hands on the surface of the ground. If using a small stone the hanafi and maliki madhabs also permit turning it over
 Dusting off the hands
Rubbing the hands with one another
 Rubbing the face with both hands

The same conditions that invalidate wudu also invalidate tayammum. In addition, a person's tayammum is invalidated as and when water becomes available. Scholars differ regarding whether the hands or face should be wiped first.

Items on which Tayammum is permitted
Tayammum is permitted on clean earth piece, but the ideas about what is inside of this definition or not is depending per maddhabs. Some maddhabs accepts baked earthen pots (unglazed), clay, limestone, the tayammum stone, taahir (pure) earth, and walls of mud, stone or brick.

Items on which Tayammum is not permitted
Tayammum is not permitted on things that are not earthen, such as things that burn and turn into ashes or things that can be melted by heat.

References

Notes

Further reading
 Lemu, B. A. Islamic Aqidah and Fiqh: A textbook of Islamic Belief and Jurisprudence revised and expanded edition of Tawhid and Fiqh), IQRA' International Educational Foundation, Chicago, 1997.

External links
 Ritual Purity in the Qur’an, hadith and fiqh (Islamic jurisprudence) including dry ablution/tayammum

Salah
Ritual purity in Islam
Salah terminology